Woody Farmer (December 25, 1935 - February 29, 2012) was an American professional wrestler and actor.

Early life 
As a young man, Farmer joined the army and the workout schedule of the army led to him taking up wrestling as a hobby. It then became a career for him.

Professional wrestling career
Farmer started out wrestling in the 1960s and was trained by Ray Stevens. His early wrestling days were spent on the Northern California, Hawaii and Las Vegas wrestling circuits.

In Phoenix on January 7, 1966, Farmer was beaten by Nikita Mulkovich. He was beaten again by Mulkovich on January 31. On October 2, 1970, Farmer and Tito Montez took on The Comancheros in Phoenix, but were beaten by them. On the 19th of that month, they beat The Comancheros.

In 1967 he wrestled for World Wide Wrestling Federation as a jobber.

In 1971, with partner Bobby Duncum, farmer defeated The Beast and Bulldog Brower and won the NWA Western States Tag Team Titles.

In 1980, Farmer was photographed at a gym for a publicity stunt with iconic stripper Carol Doda. From 1989 to 1992, Farmer was a promoter and achieved a degree of success in that field.

It was reported by the East Bay Times on February 15, 2007, that 71 year old Farmer, along with his son 43 year old son Shane Kody and 21 year old grandson Riot (both wrestlers) were to wrestle another three man tag team for the Night of Champions on the 24th of that month. On February 24 for Bay Wrestling Federation in Alameda, California, he teamed with his son Shane Kody and his grandson Riot defeating Boom Boom Comini, Johnny Starr and Mr. Frost.

During his career, Farmer had at least two titles. Once with Bobby Duncum for the NWA Western States Tag Team title in 1971 and California State Heavyweight in 1982, defeating Mike York.

Acting career 
In 1985, he played an international wrestler in Grunt! the Wrestling Movie which was directed by Alan Holzman.
Farmer had a role as Fuzzy in the Frank Harris directed Low Blow which starred Leo Fong as private eye, Joe Wong. He would appear in another film involving Fong's Joe Wong character, this time in Blood Street.

Personal life 
Farmer's son Rex is a wrestler who wrestles under the name of Shane Kody. His grandson Rex, Jnr. is also a wrestler known as Riot.

Death 
Farmer died in California from cancer at age 76 on February 29, 2012.

Filmography

References

External links
 
 Arizona Pro Wrstling History: The Death Of Woody Farmer
 Slam.canoe.com: Woody Farmer leads three generations to battle  by Mike Lano
 

1935 births
2012 deaths
American male professional wrestlers
Professional wrestlers from Virginia
People from Buchanan County, Virginia
20th-century professional wrestlers
21st-century professional wrestlers